Tatiana Cheverda  (born 29 August 1974) is a former Russian footballer who played as a defender for the Russia women's national football team. She was part of the team at the 1999 FIFA Women's World Cup.

References

External links
 

1974 births
Living people
Russian women's footballers
Russia women's international footballers
Place of birth missing (living people)
1999 FIFA Women's World Cup players
Women's association football defenders
FC Energy Voronezh players
Russian Women's Football Championship players